Lieutenant General Ramesh Halagali PVSM AVSM, SM is a former General Officer and former Deputy chief of the Army staff, Indian Army.

Halagali hails from Halagali village in Mudhol taluk in Bagalkot District, Karnataka. He studied at Sainik School Bijapur in Bijapur district, Karnataka. Halagali was commissioned into Sikh Light Infantry in December, 1972 and was Director General of Military Training until he was appointed as the deputy chief of the army staff on 11 February 2012. Lt. Gen. Halgali, was a whistle-blower in the 2009 70-acre Sukna military station land scam in West Bengal.

References

Year of birth missing (living people)
Living people
Indian generals
Military personnel from Karnataka
People from Bagalkot
Recipients of the Param Vishisht Seva Medal
Recipients of the Ati Vishisht Seva Medal
Recipients of the Sena Medal